Pârâul Sărat may refer to:

 Pârâul Sărat, a tributary of the Bâsca Mică in Buzău County
 Pârâul Sărat, a tributary of the Olt in Brașov County
 Pârâul Sărat (Vâlcea), a tributary of the Olt in Vâlcea County
 Pârâul Sărat, a tributary of the Ozunca in Covasna County
 Pârâul Sărat, a tributary of the Netezi in Neamț County
 Pârâul Sărat, a tributary of the Târnava Mare in Harghita County